On/Off (stylized as ON/OFF) is the first and debut EP of the South Korean boy group, ONF under WM Entertainment. The album was released on August 2, 2017, which consisted of five title tracks with the main title track "ON/OFF" same with the name of EP.

Background and release
On July 25, 2017,WM Entertainment released the first teaser image of "ON/OFF" debut album. On July 26, 2017, the album's tracklist of the group's debut album was released. On July 27, 2017, WM Entertainment announced the upcoming debut of 7 members names and the personal teaser image of "ON/OFF" group's debut album was released. On July 28, 2017, The highlight medley for the album was released. On July 30, 2017, the music video teaser for the debut song "ON/OFF" was released.

Commercial performance 
"ON/OFF" debuted at number 9 on the Gaon Album Chart, on the chart issue dated July 30 - August 5, 2017. The EP placed at number 24 on the chart for the month of August 2017, with 7,390 physical copies sold.

Track listing

Charts

Weekly charts

Monthly charts

Release History

References

ONF (band) EPs
2017 EPs